A Modern Utopia is a 1905 novel by H. G. Wells.

Because of the complexity and sophistication of its narrative structure, A Modern Utopia has been called "not so much a modern as a postmodern utopia." The novel is best known for its notion that a voluntary order of nobility known as the Samurai could effectively rule a "kinetic and not static" world state so as to solve "the problem of combining progress with political stability".

Conception of the work
In his preface Wells forecasts (incorrectly) that A Modern Utopia would be the last of a series of volumes on social problems that he began in 1901 with Anticipations and that included Mankind in the Making (1903).  Unlike those non-fictional works, A Modern Utopia is presented as a tale told by a sketchily described character known only as the Owner of the Voice, who, Wells warns the reader, "is not to be taken as the Voice of the ostensible author who fathers these pages." He is accompanied by another character known as "the botanist."  Interspersed into the narrative are discursive remarks on various matters, creating what Wells calls in his preface "a sort of shot-silk texture between philosophical discussion on the one hand and imaginative narrative on the other." In addition, there are frequent comparisons to and discussions of previous utopian works.

In his Experiment in Autobiography (1934) Wells wrote that A Modern Utopia "was the first approach I made to the dialogue form," and that "the trend towards dialogue, like the basal notion of the Samurai, marks my debt to Plato. A Modern Utopia, quite as much as that of More, derives frankly from the Republic."

The premise of the novel is that there is a planet (for "No less than a planet will serve the purpose of a modern Utopia") exactly like Earth, with the same geography and biology.  Moreover, on that planet "all the men and women that you know and I" exist "in duplicate." They have, however, "different habits, different traditions, different knowledge, different ideas, different clothing, and different appliances." (Not however, a different language:  "Indeed, should we be in Utopia at all, if we could not talk to everyone?").

Plot
To this planet "out beyond Sirius" the Owner of the Voice and the botanist are translated, imaginatively, "in the twinkling of an eye . . . We should scarcely note the change.  Not a cloud would have gone from the sky." Their point of entry is on the slopes of the Piz Lucendro in the Swiss Alps.

The adventures of these two characters are traced through eleven chapters.  Little by little they discover how Utopia is organized.  It is a world with "no positive compulsions at all . . . for the adult Utopian—unless they fall upon him as penalties incurred."

The Owner of the Voice and the botanist are soon required to account for their presence.  When their thumbprints are checked against records in "the central index housed in a vast series of buildings at or near Paris," both discover they have doubles in Utopia.  They journey to London to meet them, and the Owner of the Voice's double is a member of the Samurai, a voluntary order of nobility that rules Utopia.  "These samurai form the real body of the State."

Running through the novel as a foil to the main narrative is the botanist's obsession with an unhappy love affair back on Earth.  The Owner of the Voice is annoyed at this undignified and unworthy insertion of earthly affairs in Utopia, but when the botanist meets the double of his beloved in Utopia the violence of his reaction bursts the imaginative bubble that has sustained the narrative and the two men find themselves back in early twentieth-century London.

As alternate history
Researcher Michael Warren noted that A Modern Utopia was never meant to be one of Wells' landmark Science Fiction works, but was a thinly disguised sociological and philosophical essay. Placing his Utopia in an Alternate History was simply a plot device forced upon him since the world was already very thoroughly explored; unlike Thomas More or Jonathan Swift, Wells could not plausibly locate his Utopian society on an island or an unexplored corner of a faraway continent; there were none such. (...) Still, A Modern Utopia did make a very significant contribution to the genre. Alternate History of one kind or another had already been written decades earlier – but Wells seems to be the first to posit that when you make the transit to the Utopian timeline in the Alps, you find yourself in the very same spot in the other world's Alps, and when you travel in the Utopian world to an Utopian London and then cross back to our world, you find yourself on the same spot in our mundane London. This one-to-one correspondence was taken up by countless others, and is now taken for granted by any Alternate History fan – but it should be added to the great list of standard Science Fiction plot devices for which we are in debt to Wells' genius."

George Butler noted that Wells did not give any detailed description of the historical development by which his Utopian world came about. Moreover, "The historical information which Wells does provide is highly misleading," such as "The reference in Chapter 9 to "a history in which Jesus Christ had been born into a liberal and progressive Roman Empire that spread from the Arctic Ocean to the Bight of Benin, and was to know no Decline and Fall." Unfortunately, the world Wells actually depicts in Modern Utopia just does not fit this historical framework. There is no Roman Emperor reigning in Rome or Constantinople or anywhere else, nor the slightest vestige of an Imperial Administration from which this world order supposedly developed; nobody speaks Latin or any Latin-derived language except for the French language familiar from our world; there are recognizable English, French, German and Swiss people; we see a recognizable London, a recognizable Paris is mentioned though not visited, and numerous Swiss cities and towns are there, complete with famous historical landmarks which date to the Middle Ages; and in Westminster there is a kind of Parliamentary Assembly which evidently took the place of an English or British Parliament. Internal evidence strongly points to a history in which the Roman Empire did fall as it did in our history, Europe experienced the same Middle Ages we know, and its history diverged from ours at some later time. On the other hand, this London does not have a Trafalgar Square, and there is no city square at all at this location – suggesting that the Napoleonic Wars did not happen, there was no Battle of Trafalgar and no square named for it, and that London's urban development was already significantly different by the later 18th Century. (...) Tentatively, one can assume that the society of "Samurais" depicted in the book arose in the 16th or 17th Century, waged its decisive struggle against the Old Order in the 18th Century and consolidated its global rule by the early 19th – so that when we see it in the beginning of the 20th Century, it already had a century of uncontested power in which to thoroughly remake the world in its own image. (...) Use of the term "Samurai" implies some familiarity with Japanese culture and society. However, these "Samurais" have only the most loose and vague resemblance to the historical Samurai of Feudal Japan; what we see is clearly an institution founded by Westerners, borrowing a Japanese term for their own purposes."

Utopian economics  
The world shares the same language, coinage, customs, and laws, and freedom of movement is general. Some personal property is allowed, but "all natural sources of force, and indeed all strictly natural products" are "inalienably vested in the local authorities" occupying "areas as large sometimes as half England." The World State is "the sole landowner of the earth." Units of currency are based on units of energy, so that "employment would constantly shift into the areas where energy was cheap." Humanity has been almost entirely liberated from the need for physical labor:  "There appears to be no limit to the invasion of life by the machine."

The samurai and Utopian society
The narrator's double describes the ascetic Rule by which the samurai live: it includes a ban on alcohol and drugs, and a mandatory annual one-week solitary ramble in the wilderness. He also explains the social theory of Utopia, which distinguished four "main classes of mind": The Poietic, the Kinetic, the Dull, and the Base. Poietic minds are creative or inventive; kinetic minds are able but not particularly inventive; the Dull have "inadequate imagination," and the Base are mired in egotism and lack "moral sense."

The relations of the sexes
There is extensive discussion of gender roles in A Modern Utopia, but no recognition of the existence of homosexuality.  A chapter entitled "Women in a Modern Utopia" makes it clear that women are to be as free as men.  Motherhood is subsidized by the state.  Only those who can support themselves can marry, women at 21 and men at 26 or 27. Marriages that remain childless "expire" after a term of three to five years, but the partners may marry again if they choose.

Race in Utopia
A Modern Utopia is also notable for Chapter 10 ("Race in Utopia"), an enlightened discussion of race.  Contemporary racialist discourse is condemned as crude, ignorant, and extravagant.  "For my own part I am disposed to discount all adverse judgments and all statements of insurmountable differences between race and race."

Meat
The narrator is told, "In all the round world of Utopia there is no meat. There used to be. But now we cannot stand the thought of slaughter-houses. And, in a population that is all educated, and at about the same level of physical refinement, it is practically impossible to find anyone who will hew a dead ox or pig. We never settled the hygienic question of meat-eating at all. This other aspect decided us. I can still remember, as a boy, the rejoicings over the closing of the last slaughter-house." Members of the Utopian society still consume fish, however, and no rational explanation is offered for the discrepancy.

Cats, dogs and horses

It is noted that the Utopian society embarked on "a systematic world-wide attempt to destroy for ever a great number of contagious and infectious diseases." This involved not only the elimination of rats and mice, but also – "for a time at any rate" – "a stringent suppression of the free movement of familiar animals," i.e.: "the race of cats and dogs – providing, as it does, living fastnesses to which such diseases as plague, influenza, catarrhs and the like, can retreat to sally forth again – must pass for a time out of freedom, and the filth made by horses and the other brutes of the highway vanish from the face of the earth." There are no cats or dogs to be seen anywhere in the Utopian cities. It is not specified what happened to the dogs, cats and horses living in the world when this change took place and whether some of them are still preserved in a location completely segregated from human society, to be reintroduced at some future date.

Exile islands

Misfits who do not fit into the Utopian society are regularly exiled to islands and there left to their own devices. They may perpetuate institutions and social behaviors considered long obsolete elsewhere. For example, they may erect Customs barriers and impose customs duties on goods imported to their islands, while the rest of the world has long since become a single economic zone.

This concept of "islands of exile" was later taken up by Aldus Huxley in Brave New World – but with a reversed value judgement. Where Wells presented a positive Utopian society exiling incorrigible reactionaries, Huxley had a Dystopian regime exiling creative people who rebel against its stifling rule.

Origins
The work was partly inspired by a trip to the Alps Wells made with his friend Graham Wallas, a prominent member of the Fabian Society.

Reception
Several Samurai societies were formed in response to A Modern Utopia, and Wells met members of one of them in April 1907 at the New Reform Club.

At a memorial service at the Royal Institution on 30 October 1946, two and a half months after Wells's death, William Beveridge read passages from the book and called it the work that had influenced him the most.

According to Vincent Brome, Wells's first comprehensive biographer after his death, it was widely read by university students and "released hundreds of young people into sexual adventure." W. Warren Wagar praised it, describing it and Wells's other utopian novels (Men Like Gods and The Shape of Things to Come) as "landmarks in that extraordinarily difficult genre." Indeed, The Shape of Things to Come takes up many themes of the earlier book, also depicting a self-appointed elite conducting massive social engineering and remaking of the world.

Joseph Conrad complained to Wells that he did not "take sufficient account of human imbecility, which is cunning and perfidious."

E.M. Forster satirised what he regarded as the book's unhealthy conformism in his science-fiction story "The Machine Stops", first published only four years later, in 1909.

Marie-Louise Berneri was also critical of the book, stating that "Wells commits the faults of his forerunners by introducing a vast amount of legislation into his utopia" and that "Wells's conception of freedom turns out to be a very narrow one." Wells's biographer Michael Sherborne criticizes the book for depicting "an undemocratic one-party state" in which truth is established not by critical discussion but by shared faith.

References

Bibliography
 Deery, June. "H.G. Wells's A Modern Utopia as a Work in Progress." Extrapolation (Kent State University Press). 34.3 (1993): 216–229. EBSCO Host. Salem State College Library Databases. Salem, Massachusetts. 18 April 2008. 
 "H.G. Wells." The Literature Network. 1 2000–2008. 18 April 2008. 
 McLean, Steven. ""The Fertilising Conflict of Individualities": H. G. Wells's A Modern Utopia, John Stuart Mill's on Liberty, and the..." Papers on Language and Literature. 2 2007. 166. eLibrary. Proquest CSA. Salem State College Library Databases. Salem, Massachusetts. 18 April 2008. 
 Review: [untitled], by A. W. S. The American Journal of Sociology, Vol. 11, No. 3 (November 1905), pp. 430–431. Published by: The University of Chicago Press. JSTOR. Salem State College Library Databases. Salem, Massachusetts. 18 April 2008. 
 Review: [untitled], by C. M. H. The Journal of Political Economy, Vol. 14, No. 9 (November 1906), pp. 581–582. Published by: The University of Chicago Press. JSTOR. Salem State College Library Databases. Salem, Massachusetts. 18 April 2008. 
 Wells, H.G. A Modern Utopia. New York, New York: Penguin Group, 2005.

External links
 

Books by H. G. Wells
1905 British novels
1905 science fiction novels
Utopian novels
Chapman & Hall books
Religion in science fiction
British science fiction novels
Novels set on fictional planets